, stylized as ANIMAX, is a Japanese animation satellite television network, dedicated to broadcasting anime programming. The channel also dubbed other cartoons in Japanese language.

Animax is the first and largest 24-hour network in the world dedicated to anime.

Animax operates as separate 24-hour TV channels for Japan, Asia (formerly) (four separate feeds for South East Asia, the Philippines, Hong Kong and Taiwan), South Asia and South Korea (formerly), in addition to VOD platforms in Germany, Austria and Switzerland.

History

Japan 
Established on May 20, 1998, by Sony,  originally premiered in Japan on July 1, the same year, across the SKY PerfecTV! satellite television platform. Headquartered in Minato, Tokyo, Japan, and presided by Masao Takiyama, Animax's shareholders and founders include Sony Pictures Entertainment (Japan), Sunrise, Toei Animation, TMS Entertainment, and NAS. Its founders also include noted anime producer and production designer Yoshirō Kataoka. The network began broadcasting in high definition from October 2009.

Animax also exhibits affiliations with anime pioneer Osamu Tezuka's Tezuka Productions company, Pierrot, Nippon Animation, and numerous others. It has produced and exclusively premiered several anime in Japan, such as Ghost in the Shell: Stand Alone Complex, Ultra Maniac, Astro Boy, Hungry Heart: Wild Striker, Aishiteruze Baby, and many others, including Madhouse's anime adaptations of Marvel's Iron Man, Wolverine, and X-Men.

Noted Japanese celebrities and personalities to have appeared on Animax with their own programs, include actress Natsuki Katō, among numerous others. The network's narrators are the voice actors Yukari Tamura and Kōsuke Okano, and from October 2007, Sayuri Yahagi. Animax also hosts and organizes several anime-based competitions across Japan, such as the Animax Taishō scriptwriting competition and Animax Anison Grand Prix anime song music competition, which are judged by a panel of noted anime figures, as well as several events and concerts across Japan, such as the annual , an annual live concert during which renowned Japanese bands, artists and voice actors perform to a live audience, often held at Zepp Tokyo.

Apart from operating its business primarily as a television network, Animax has also begun operating a mobile television service. In February 2007, Animax announced that it would be launching a mobile television service of its network on the mobile phone company MOBAHO! from April 2007, having its programming being viewable by the company's mobile phone subscribers.

Asia 

Animax launched separate Asian versions of the channel featuring its anime programming within separate networks and feeds in the respective regions and languages beginning in 2004. The first one was launched in Taiwan and the Philippines on January 1, 2004, and in Hong Kong on January 12, 2004. A week later, Animax launched in Southeast Asia on January 19, 2004, featuring its programming within feeds in English audio, as well as Japanese audio, with English subtitling, and other languages in the region, becoming the company's first English-language network.

On July 5, 2004, Animax India was launched across India and neighboring countries featuring its programming in English.

On April 29, 2006, Animax started its operations in South Korea, broadcasting separately from Seoul.

In January 2020, Sony sold the South Korean and Southeast Asian Animax channels to former Sony Pictures Television executives Andy Kaplan and George Chien, who have since formed KC Global Media.

Animax ceased transmissions in Laos, 16 March 2021. One year later, Astro shut the channel down on the 1st of January 2022 in Malaysia.

Latin America 

Animax was launched in Latin America on July 31, 2005, replacing Locomotion after Sony's purchase from Hearst Corporation and Corus Entertainment, in January 2005.

Animax Latin America would rebrand in August 2007, coinciding with the premiere of a new adult-oriented programming block named Lollipop. Likewise, on March 18, 2008, it was announced that the mobile service Animax Mobile, available on Japan and Australia, was to be launched as well in Mexico and eventually in other Latin American countries.

Animax Latin America would eventually incorporate live-action programming and was later relaunched as Sony Spin on May 1, 2011, with anime programming retained until March 2012. Sony Spin would be discontinued on July 1, 2014 and replaced with a local version of Lifetime.

North America 
Animax has sponsored several anime-based events across North America, including hosting an anime festival, in association with other anime distributive enterprises such as Bandai Entertainment and Viz Media, across Sony's San Francisco-based entertainment shopping complex Metreon in October 2001, during which it aired numerous of its anime titles across the centre, including special Gundam, The Making of Metropolis, and Love Hina screenings.

The noted international business newspaper Financial Times, reported, in September 2004, of Sony planning and being "keen" to launch Animax across the United States and North America, after Sony had signed an agreement with the largest cable company in the United States, Comcast, with whom it had co-partnered in a US$4.8 billion acquisition of legendary Hollywood studio MGM, to bring at least three of Sony's television networks across the region.

On June 13, 2007, Sony Pictures Television International officially announced that Animax would be launching its mobile television service, Animax Mobile, in Canada from July 2007, on Bell Digital's mobile phone service. This was Animax Mobile's third major expansion, after initially launching the mobile television service in Japan from April 2007 and Australia from June 12, 2007.

On January 17, 2012, the streaming service Crackle, added Animax to their lineup for the North America region, marking the network's first launch in the United States. Its programming has included for the first time several of Animax's English language dubs, including that of shows that had yet been adapted into English and had only aired in Southeast Asia and South Asia prior, such as Nodame Cantabile, Yōkai Ningen Bem and several others. Towards the end of 2013, the Animax branding was dropped, though Crackle continues to stream anime titles.

Europe 

In April 2007, Animax launched across several countries in Europe, including Hungary, Romania, the Czech Republic, Slovakia, with Sony announcing plans to launch in the United Kingdom, Germany, Italy, Spain, Portugal, France, Poland (put on hiatus) and other major countries in the continent, with discussions at an advanced stage. The launch marked Animax's first major expansion into Europe. The network then soon launched in Germany in May 2007, Spain and Portugal in 2008.

The channel was closed on 31 March 2014.

United Kingdom 
In October 2007, further details emerged on Animax's launch details in the United Kingdom, with Sony Pictures Television International senior-vice president of international networks Ross Hair being quoted by Brand Republic's Media Week as stating that Sony was preparing to launch Animax in the United Kingdom initially as a video on demand service alongside other Sony television networks, with Sony also looking at launching Animax across the free digital television service Freeview subject to new frequencies and slot being available.

As of April 2011, one of Sony's 3 channels that they were planning to launch in the UK since 2007, Sony Entertainment Television, is now available there on Sky following Sony's acquisition of channel slots 157 and 190, which were previously owned by Film 24 and Open Access 3, respectively, not only making it now possible that Sony can launch Animax in the UK but also marking Sony Pictures Television's entry into both the British and Irish markets. On October 15, 2013, Sony Pictures Television announced it will launch a UK version of Animax as a SVOD service. SPT also announced a multi-year volume deal with Viz Media to secure exclusive content for the service.

The SVOD service launched online on October 24, 2013, with three simulcast series and over twenty archive series including many titles which originally debuted on Kaze's Anime On Demand service. Some content has also appeared on Sony Movie Channel's Late Night Anime block, with the channel's website referencing Animax. Starting from March 2014, the Late Night Anime block has since been rebranded to Animax. An app for PlayStation 4 was released in October 2014.

On March 5, 2015, Scuzz launched Animax Movie Nights, a weekly block that aired anime movies on Thursday nights for the next month.

On October 15, 2018, the service closed down and subscribers are being directed to Funimation.

Hungary, Romania, Czech Republic and Slovakia 
In September 2006, Sony Pictures Television International bought A+ (Anime+) television channel and rebranded it as Animax in July 2007. The channel aired from 8 pm to 2 am on same frequency as Minimax and broadcast anime in Japanese with Romanian subtitles and also with Romanian dubbing in Romania, with Hungarian dubbing in Hungary and with Czech dubbing for the most of them in the Czech Republic and Slovakia.
Among the most popular series were: Naruto, Bleach, Fullmetal Alchemist, InuYasha, Death Note, D.Gray-man, Blood+, Kaleido Star, Hell Girl, Kilari, Dragon Ball GT, Kirarin Revolution, Love Com,  Vampire Knight, MegaMan NT Warrior, Trigun, Slayers, Yu-Gi-Oh!, Digimon, Gankutsuou: The Count of Monte Cristo, Nana, Kiddy Grade.

On June 1, 2009, the channel changed its focus, targeting a more broad young adult audience and adding more American television series. At the same time, it dropped support of its forums on its website and, in September 2013, closed them entirely. On June 9, 2009, RCS & RDS (Digi), the largest Romanian cable operator dropped the channel due to high costs of broadcasting.

On March 31, 2014, the channel was closed down and replaced by C8.

Meanwhile, in Romania, Sony's AXN Spin was launched on 1 March 2013 on Romtelecom's digital lineup, a few months after both Minimax and Animax were dropped from that platform. Until 2015, AXN Spin broadcast Naruto, Dragon Ball GT, Dragon Ball Z Kai, Kinniku Banzuke, Kirarin Revolution and Hello Kitty.

Spain and Portugal 

Animax began as a programming block in Spain and Portugal in the channel AXN. Shows broadcast on the block include InuYasha, Outlaw Star, Trigun, Orphen, Excel Saga and Samurai Champloo. Later shows include Corrector Yui, The Law of Ueki, Detective Conan, Lupin III and Kochikame. These shows were shown in Portugal and Spain from October 2007 until September 2008, airing weekends from 13:00 to 16:00.

The full channel was subsequently launched on April 12, 2008, on the Movistar TV and Digital+ platforms in Spain and Meo and Clix in Portugal. Among the series broadcast across Animax's networks in Spain and Portugal were  Nana, Black Lagoon, Love Hina, Tsubasa: Reservoir Chronicle, Chobits, Devil May Cry. As of 2011, the Portuguese feed was removed due to low ratings and was replaced by AXN Black, an offshoot of AXN. In 2013, the Spanish feed rebranded and eliminated all of its western programming in favor for anime, although the programming consisted on continuous reruns of four anime, later reduced to two. On December 31, 2013, the Spanish feed was also removed due to its low ratings.

Italy 
Animax in Italy began as a nighttime 1-hour programming block on sister channel AXN Italy on January 12, 2008, indicating that it will eventually launch as a 24/7 channel. The programs that aired on the block were Planetes, The Vision of Escaflowne, .hack//SIGN, and Noein. The block hasn't aired since 2009, likely to avoid competition with MTV, who also aired anime and was more widely available.

Germany 

On May 14, 2007, Sony announced Animax would be launching in Germany from early June 2007, becoming the country's first ever television network solely dedicated to anime programming. Animax launched in the country from June 5, 2007, on Unity Media's digital subscription television service in the regions of North Rhine-Westphalia, Hesse and other regions. Among the first anime series premiering on Animax Germany were .hack//Sign, Dragon Ball, Earth Girl Arjuna, Eureka Seven, Gundam SEED, Oh My Goddess!, One Piece, Record of Lodoss War, School Rumble, The Candidate for Goddess, X and numerous others. The channel later launched into Austria and Switzerland.

The TV channel closed on July 7, 2016, Animax continues as VOD in Germany, Austria and Switzerland.

On September 30 2022, Animax VOD in Germany close down and replaced by Crunchyroll

Poland 
Start of network in Poland was in plans, following on other similar expansions around Central Europe. But currently, plans have stopped and there are no longer plans to do due to financial reasons. It was, however, available as a daily block on AXN Spin HD (which is an offshoot of AXN Poland) airing on late mornings, the afternoon, and sometimes late at night. Programs airing on the block included Dragon Ball GT, Naruto, Vampire Knight, Kilari, Deltora Quest, D.gray-man, Fullmetal Alchemist: The Sacred Star of Milos, the Slayers series, and Soul Eater.

Australia 
Animax launched as a two-hour programming block on the Sci Fi Channel Australia (which is co-owned by Animax's parent Sony Pictures Entertainment) from November 5, 2008, playing on Wednesday nights and Saturday mornings. It launched with the series Ghost in the Shell: Stand Alone Complex, Cowboy Bebop, Black Lagoon and Blood+. This is Animax's latest English language network, following their networks in Southeast Asia, South Asia and South Africa. Previously, Animax had also been similarly launched as a three-hour programming block in Spain and Portugal on AXN (also similarly owned by Sony Pictures Entertainment), beginning from 2007 and then subsequently fully launching as a separate 24-hour anime network on April 12, 2008. As of 2016, the block is no longer on air.

Animax programming has also been available since June 12, 2007, through its mobile television service, Animax Mobile, available on 3 mobile's 3G network. Its initial programming on launch consisted of four full-length anime series, Blood+, R.O.D the TV, Gankutsuou: The Count of Monte Cristo and Last Exile. As of 2016 Animax Mobile doesn't exist anymore in Australia.

Africa 
In August 2007, it was announced that Animax would be launching across several countries in Africa, including South Africa, Namibia, Zimbabwe, Botswana, Zambia, Mozambique and Lesotho, on the DStv satellite service and in Nigeria on HiTV, from March 19, 2009. On 31 October 2010, Animax was removed from DSTV, due to a lack of viewers brought on by channel drift (as reality shows occupied the majority of the schedule, similar to Animax Latin America and Animax Spain), to be replaced with a more general Sony channel in February 2011, as Sony MAX.

South Africa 
The network began broadcasting on DStv on November 3, 2007, until it was terminated on October 31, 2010, and featured English language programming. It had been lauded by publications such as The Times for having singularly spread awareness about anime than any other platform, and celebrated its first year of broadcasts in South Africa in November 2008. Sony Pictures Television International manager Philipp Schmidt was quoted by The Times as saying that Animax's primary goal was to "establish itself as the destination for anime programming" in South Africa, and also that the feedback that it has received has shown it has been making an impact in the country. Animax South Africa premiered programs such as Neon Genesis Evangelion, Tenjo Tenge, Ghost in the Shell: Stand Alone Complex, Record of Lodoss War, .hack//SIGN, Negima! Magister Negi Magi, Mobile Suit Gundam SEED, Eureka Seven, Angelic Layer, SoltyRei, Black Cat, Hinotori, Final Fantasy: Unlimited, Chrono Crusade, Last Exile, Samurai 7, Burst Angel, Black Jack, Black Lagoon, Hellsing, Wolf's Rain, Basilisk, Gantz, Paranoia Agent, Witchblade and Elfen Lied.

Other ventures

Animax Mobile 
Apart from operating its programming as a television network, Animax begun launching its programming across mobile television, first beginning in their original home in Japan and subsequently overseas. In February 2007, Animax announced that it would be launching a mobile television service in Japan on the mobile phone company MOBAHO! from April 2007, having its programming being viewable by the company's mobile phone subscribers. Subsequently, in June 2007, it launched in Australia and Canada, its first English language mobile networks, in Latin America on March 18, 2008, and Southeast Asia on November and December 2008, their third mobile English language network, launching in Malaysia and Singapore through mobile service providers Astro, Maxis and StarHub respectively.

As of 2016 the Animax Mobile service is discontinued worldwide, However, Animax Live Streaming Channel are still Available on Selected Countries such as Hong Kong, Philippines, Indonesia, Singapore and Malaysia, Selected Countries also available On Demand Across Southeast Asia (Hong Kong, Singapore, Malaysia, Indonesia, Philippines) and Germany (Deutschland, Switzerland and Austria).

Game arenas 
Sony Pictures Television International signed a deal with developer Arkadium on January 7, 2009, to provide game arenas for Sony Pictures Television International websites, including Animax, with more than forty games licensed.

Programming 

Animax's programming is dedicated to anime, and it has been acknowledged as the largest 24-hour anime-only network in the world. In its original network in Japan, it has exclusively premiered several anime, which have aired first on Animax, including Ghost in the Shell: Stand Alone Complex, Hungry Heart: Wild Striker, Aishiteruze Baby, Wangan Midnight and the 2010 anime adaptation of Marvel's Iron Man by Madhouse Studios. In addition, its English language network, Animax Asia, aired the first ever anime simulcast with their simulcast of Tears to Tiara on the same time as the Japanese premiere and the new Fullmetal Alchemist: Brotherhood series, on the same week as the Japanese premiere. Its viewer reach has been quoted as spanning over 89 million homes. across 62 countries and 17 languages.

Other series it has broadcast both in Japan, often being nationwide premieres, as well as its networks worldwide, include Blood+, Cowboy Bebop, Code Geass: Lelouch of the Rebellion, the entire Mobile Suit Gundam series, Honey and Clover, InuYasha, Fullmetal Alchemist, Eureka Seven, Urusei Yatsura, Ranma ½, Rurouni Kenshin, the Dragon Ball series, Cardcaptor Sakura, Tsubasa Chronicle, Chobits, The Vision of Escaflowne, Death Note, Neon Genesis Evangelion, Ouran High School Host Club, Wolf's Rain, Future Boy Conan, Haikara-san ga Tōru, Emma - A Victorian Romance, Darker than Black, Wangan Midnight, and Kyo Kara Maoh! as well as several OVA series and anime films, such as Steamboy, Metropolis, Memories, Tokyo Godfathers, Ghost in the Shell, Ghost in the Shell 2: Innocence, Nasu: Summer in Andalusia, Blood: The Last Vampire, Appleseed, Escaflowne, Spooky Kitaro, Pumpkin Scissors, and Fate/Stay Night.

Translation and dubbing teams 
Animax have utilized numerous translation and dubbing studios for the broadcast of numerous of its anime series across its English-language networks in Southeast Asia and South Asia, some of which were not licensed by North American distributors and do not have any English adaptation counterparts, such as Detective School Q, Dokkiri Doctor, Twin Spica, Absolute Boy, Emma: A Victorian Romance, Future Boy Conan, numerous installments of the World Masterpiece Theater series, InuYasha: The Final Act, and numerous others. Animax have also produced and aired uncensored English versions and dubs of anime series, among the most notable of them being their dub of Cardcaptor Sakura, which was shown uncensored and retained all of the original names, plot details and dialogue, and numerous others.

For broadcast across its English-language networks, Animax has also broadcast English dubs produced by other enterprises, such as Bandai Visual, Ocean Productions, Animaze, Funimation, Bang Zoom! Entertainment, NBCUniversal Entertainment Japan, A.D. Vision, Viz Media, Central Park Media, Omni Productions, and numerous others, airing their dubs of Cowboy Bebop, Witch Hunter Robin, Mobile Suit Gundam, Brain Powerd, Please Teacher!, Galaxy Angel, Earth Maiden Arjuna, Jubei-chan: The Ninja Girl, Carried by the Wind: Tsukikage Ran, Angel Tales, Saber Marionette, Appleseed, Alien Nine, the InuYasha films, Fullmetal Alchemist, Yukikaze and several others with Infinite Stratos.

See also 
 Animax Taishō
 List of programs broadcast by Animax
 AniTek OVA

References

External links 
 Official sites
 Animax 
 Animax International

 Asia
 Animax Asia
 Animax Korea 
 Animax Taiwan 

 Europe
 Animax Germany 

 
Anime companies
Anime television
Bandai Namco Holdings subsidiaries
Satellite television
Sony subsidiaries
Sony Pictures Entertainment
Sony Pictures Television
Mass media companies based in Tokyo
Mass media in Tokyo
Television channels and stations established in 1998
1998 establishments in Japan
Children's television networks